Monster Magnet is an American rock band. Hailing from Red Bank, New Jersey, the group was founded in 1989 by Dave Wyndorf (vocals and guitar), John McBain (guitar) and Tim Cronin (vocals and drums); they have since gone through several lineup changes, leaving Wyndorf as the only constant member. Monster Magnet has released ten studio albums to date, and they are best known for their 1990s hits "Negasonic Teenage Warhead" and "Space Lord". The band has also been credited for developing and popularizing the stoner rock genre, along with Masters of Reality, Kyuss, Fu Manchu and Sleep.

Career

Beginnings and Spine of God (1989–1992) 
Original names for the band were Dog of Mystery, Airport 75, Triple Bad Acid and King Fuzz before finally settling on Monster Magnet, taken from the name of a 1960s toy made by Wham-O, which Wyndorf liked when he was a child.

In 1989, Monster Magnet released two demo cassettes: Forget About Life, I'm High on Dope and I'm Stoned, What Ya Gonna Do About It?. The band's first "official" release was a single "Lizard Johnny/Freakshop USA" on Long Island-based Circuit Records. The first demo and single were recorded as a three piece (McBain, guitar and bass, Wyndorf, guitar and vocals, Cronin, drums and vocals).  Before the second demo Jon Kleiman and Joe Calandra joined on drums and bass respectively. Thus the lineup was composed of McBain on guitar, Wyndorf on guitar and vocals, Cronin on vocals, Kleiman on drums and Calandra on bass.  The EP Monster Magnet followed, on Glitterhouse Records of Germany, containing the songs "Snake Dance" and "Nod Scene", (both of which would appear again on Spine of God), and "Tractor", (which would be re-recorded later for Powertrip).

In 1990 the band signed with Caroline Records and released a single "Murder/Tractor". Cronin left shortly after; although he would remain in the background- particularly at live shows- contributing to auditory effects, lights, and visuals, for many years. In 1991 they released their first full-length album, the cult classic Spine of God on the labels Go Get Organized/Atypeek Music, Primo Scree, Glitterhouse Records, Caroline Records, Glitterhouse Records. The album is hailed as one of the classics of the stoner rock genre ranking 28th on Heavy Planet's "Top 50 of All Time". The album contained the single "Medicine" (which would be re-recorded ten years later on God Says No), which was also the band's first music video. The band followed with a tour alongside rising grunge band Soundgarden. The tour helped the band get a recording contract with major record label A&M Records.

Their final release with Caroline Records was an EP titled Tab which included, among two other marathon-length songs, a 32-minute track called "Tab...". The Tab EP was recorded before Spine of God, yet released after it.  McBain quit the band soon after and was replaced by Atomic Bitchwax guitarist Ed Mundell.

A&M Records-era and popularity (1992–2002) 
In 1992, Monster Magnet was signed to A&M Records, and their first album on the label, Superjudge, was released the following year. Despite being released on a major label, it fared poorly commercially. The songs "Twin Earth" and "Face Down" were released as singles (with accompanying videos), but it did little to help promote the album.

Dopes to Infinity (1995), the follow-up record, had a hit single, "Negasonic Teenage Warhead", which benefitted from a music video that received regular rotation on MTV. Still, the album was not as successful as the band had hoped.

After the Dopes to Infinity tour, Wyndorf moved to Las Vegas, Nevada in order to begin working on Powertrip (1998), a breakthrough hit that finally earned the band a gold record. Guitarist Phil Caivano joined the band in 1998. "Space Lord", the first single, was a major radio hit and the band went on tour with successful bands Aerosmith, Metallica and Rob Zombie. The band also toured as one of the opening acts of the bands Hole and Marilyn Manson co-headlined Beautiful Monsters Tour. Following the well-publicized falling out between the outspoken vocalists of Hole and Marilyn Manson, Monster Magnet continued touring with Manson and opened the first three shows of his Rock is Dead Tour. The songs "Powertrip", "Temple of Your Dreams", and "See You In Hell" also received airplay on rock radio stations. The album charted at No. 97 on the Billboard 200.

After a two-year tour supporting Powertrip, the band released God Says No (2001), charting at No. 153 on Billboard. However, it failed to match the commercial success of the band's previous release. After the release, Joe Calandra and Jon Kleiman left the band. They would be replaced by Jim Baglino and Michael Wildwood who recorded Monolithic Baby! and, after a short stint, Wildwood was replaced by former Love Among Freaks drummer Bob Pantella, respectively. The band also left A&M Records during this period.

Following the split from A&M Records, Monster Magnet wrote and performed "Live For The Moment", which was the former entrance theme of WWE wrestler Matt Hardy from 2002 to 2010. The song also appeared on the WWF Forceable Entry compilation.

Monolithic Baby! and 4-Way Diablo (2003–2008) 
In 2003, Monster Magnet released Greatest Hits, a double album featuring their best songs, some rarities, and music videos from their time with A&M. They then signed to the European label SPV, and in early 2004 released Monolithic Baby! throughout Europe. The US release followed in May on SPV America. The band had a minor hit with the song "Unbroken (Hotel Baby)".

In March 2005, Caivano departed after seven years service in a split described as amicable by Wyndorf. A followup to Monolithic Baby! was expected in March 2006, to coincide with their European tour, along with re-releases of Spine of God and Tab, both featuring new artwork and liner notes; however the tour and album releases failed to materialize.

On February 27, 2006, Dave Wyndorf overdosed on prescription drugs and was hospitalized.

In 2007, it was announced that Monster Magnet would release a new album, 4-Way Diablo, which had been put back for a year because of Wyndorf's overdose. It was released later that year. Later in 2007, another greatest hits collection, 20th Century Masters – The Millennium Collection: The Best of Monster Magnet, was released.  "Powertrip" was used as the official theme song for the WWE pay-per-view event No Way Out 2007.

Prior to Monster Magnet's 2008 European tour, Caivano returned to the band.

Mastermind, Last Patrol and Mindfucker (2009–2019)
On November 24, 2009, it was announced that Monster Magnet had signed a new deal with Napalm Records. The band also announced that they would enter the studio in January 2010 to record a new album for a summer release. According to Wyndorf, the band is very pleased with the label, which is "doing a good job".

The new album, Mastermind, was released in October 2010. The band embarked on a massive European tour, in August and then in November–December 2010, to promote their new album. After the tour, Ed Mundell left the band after 18 years "to collaborate with other musicians and producers", forming The Ultra Electric Mega Galactic. Wyndorf stated that Garrett Sweeny (Riotgod) replaced Ed on the tour.

In the fall of 2011, Monster Magnet toured and performed the seminal Dopes to Infinity record in its entirety throughout Europe. One year later they did the same thing with their 1992 album Spine of God.

Last Patrol was released in North America on October 15, 2013. Monster Magnet's website also announced a North American tour for the album, their first in ten years. However, the remaining shows in mid-December got cancelled because of Wyndorf's influenza. The tour resumed in Europe in January and continued through February. Wyndorf stated that the band would play at each show the entire Last Patrol.

In November 2014 a reworked version of "Last Patrol" called Milking the Stars: A Re-Imagining of Last Patrol was released, and in October 2015, a reworked version of "Mastermind" called Cobras and Fire (The Mastermind Redux) was released. Featuring re-recordings and new arrangements, they contained a less polished, psychedelic production. In 2016, the band reissued the A&M era LPs with bonus content via Spinefarm Records. They toured Europe again.

Monster Magnet's first studio album in five years, Mindfucker, was released on March 23, 2018.

A Better Dystopia (2020–present)
As of December 2020, Monster Magnet has been working on their eleventh studio album. It was mentioned that same month by Loudwire in their "88 of 2021's Most Anticipated Rock + Metal Albums" list. The band released the first single of the album A Better Dystopia on March 23, 2021: Mr. Destroyer, a cover of the Poobah song.  A Better Dystopia is 12 tracks of cover songs.   Released on May 21, 2021, the album received critical acclaim.

Musical style and influences

Monster Magnet is noted for having a "heavy and spacy sound". They have been described as a "space-metal outfit [that] helped codify the stoner-rock template with their landmark efforts in the early 1990s". The album Superjudge, according to Metal Injection, "helped forge a sound that crafted a band and a genre." Their sound has been described as "heady heavy metal". Additionally, Monster Magnet is regarded as space rock, hard rock, and as part of the first wave of alternative metal. Their style is heavily influenced by 1970s space rock bands such as Hawkwind, psychedelia and early metal bands such as Black Sabbath, Deep Purple, Blue Öyster Cult and Sir Lord Baltimore.  

In addition to recording covers such as Black Sabbath's "Into the Void" (Master of Reality, 1971) and Hawkwind's "Brainstorm" (Doremi Fasol Latido, 1972), Wyndorf sometimes incorporated elements of space rock staples into his own songs. For instance, the Dopes to Infinity title track borrows some of its lyrics from "Lord of Light" (ibid.), and Superjudges "Twin Earth" is a reinterpretation of Captain Beyond's "Mesmerization Eclipse" (Captain Beyond, 1972). The main guitar riff to the track Dopes To Infinity is lifted from The Sir Lord Baltimore song "Woman Tamer" (Sir Lord Baltimore, 1971). The band has cited the British band Depeche Mode as an influence on its music. They covered Depeche Mode's "Black Celebration" for For the Masses, a 1998 Depeche Mode tribute album.

Wyndorf is a fan of 1960s comic books, particularly ones by Jack Kirby.  He mentions Kirby in the song "Melt" from God Says No.  He also mentions Marvel Comics characters MODOK (on "Baby Götterdämmerung" from Powertrip) and Ego the Living Planet (on "Ego, The Living Planet" from Dopes to Infinity). "Mindless Ones" from the album "Last Patrol" has references to the race of the same name, Dormammu, Great Vishanti and The Ancient One from Marvel's 'Doctor Strange'. "All Shook Out" from God Says No has a reference to "Children of the Atom" which is a reference to X-Men, also from Marvel Comics. Additionally, Marvel's Fantastic Four is referenced in the song "The Titan Who Cried Like a Baby" on their Mastermind album.

In other media

Television
The television drama series Sons of Anarchy uses Monster Magnet tracks frequently. Those featured include "Monolithic" in season 1 (episode 10), "Radiation Day", "Slut Machine" and "Freeze and Pixelate" in season 2 (episodes 1, 4 and 13), and "100 Million Miles" in season 3 (episode 12).

Tracks from the 2001 album God Says No have been used in television series, including the sci-fi TV series Alphas ("Heads Explode"), and The Shield, which featured the track "God Says No" in an early episode.

The reality series Viva La Bam also used several tracks from Monolithic Baby!, such as 'Slut Machine', 'Supercruel', and 'Unbroken' during multiple episodes.

Film
Tracks from the 1995 album Dopes to Infinity were included on the soundtrack for The Matrix ("Look to Your Orb for the Warning") and The Girl Next Door ("Dopes to Infinity"). The soundtrack of the 1994 movie S.F.W. features an early, otherwise-unreleased version of a song originally from Dopes to Infinity, "Negasonic Teenage Warhead". The 1999 film Beowulf features the track "Lord 13" from Monster Magnet's early 1990s EP Tab during its end credits. The film Boys (1996) features the track "The Secret".

Several tracks from the 1998 Monster Magnet album Powertrip have been featured in film soundtracks, including "See You in Hell" in Bride of Chucky (1998), "Powertrip" in Soldier (1998), "Crop Circle" in Urban Legend (1998), and "Space Lord" in Talladega Nights: The Ballad of Ricky Bobby (2006). "Big God", the bonus track on the Japanese edition of the album (and also B-side to "Space Lord"), appears in The Crow: Salvation (2000).

Tracks from the 2001 album God Says No have also been used in films. Heavy Metal 2000 (2000) includes "Silver Future"; Made (2001) includes "Down in the Jungle"; and Dracula 2000 (2000) includes "Heads Explode", and part of the music video for "Heads Explode" is also shown in Dracula 2000. The 2004 mountain bike film New World Disorder V - Disorderly Conduct features "Radiation Day" and "Slut Machine" on its soundtrack.

Monster Magnet contributed a cover of the MC5 song "Kick Out the Jams" to the Varsity Blues soundtrack. They also performed their track "Master of Light" from Monolithic Baby! live in a scene in the movie Torque.

The Marvel Comics character Negasonic Teenage Warhead, featured in the 2016 film Deadpool and its sequel, is named after the song of the same name from the band's album Dopes to Infinity.

Video games
Sony Computer Entertainment's 2007 PlayStation 3 release MotorStorm featured "Powertrip" from Powertrip.
Electronic Arts's early 90s release Road Rash featured "Dinosaur Vacuum" from Superjudge.
Activision Value's 2006 release American Chopper featured "Space Lord".
MercurySteam's 2017 release "Raiders of the Broken Planet", later renamed to "Spacelords", featured "Space lord" as the opening theme

Promotional use
The Crusty Demons Freestyle Motocross series has used both "Powertrip" from Powertrip and "Melt" from God Says No.
"Live for the Moment" was the theme song of WWE wrestler Matt Hardy, and was featured on WWF Forceable Entry.
"Space Lord" is used in a commercial for the Swedish chain store JC (jeans and clothes).
"Powertrip" from Powertrip was the official theme song for No Way Out 2007 for WWE.

Band membersCurrent members Dave Wyndorf – vocals, rhythm guitar (1989–present)
 Phil Caivano – rhythm guitar, lead guitar (1998–2005, 2008–present)
 Bob Pantella – drums (2004–present)
 Garrett Sweeny – lead guitar (2010–present)
 Alec Morton – bass guitar (2020–present)Former members'''
 John McBain – lead guitar, bass (1989-1992)
 Tim Cronin – vocals, drums, bass (1989–1990)
 Tom Diello – drums (1989–1991)
 Ed Mundell – lead guitar (1992–2010)
 Joe Calandra – bass guitar (1990–2001)
 Jon Kleiman – drums (1991–2001)
 Jim Baglino – bass guitar (2001–2013)
 Michael Wildwood – drums (2001-2004)
 Chris Kosnik - bass guitar (2013-2020)

Timeline

Members' other projects
As teenagers, Wyndorf and Caivano played in punk/power pop band Shrapnel from the late 70s until 1985. The band was managed by Legs McNeil, put out two indie singles and an EP on Elektra Records, played with the Ramones at CBGB, featured guitar from future producer Daniel Rey, and appeared both on the Uncle Floyd Show and in a Frank Miller issue of Amazing Spider-Man.

Since the mid-1990s, Cronin and Kleiman have fronted The Ribeye Bros. In 2003, Pantella mixed and plays bass on The Glasspack's Bridgeburner'' album. Mundell also played lead guitar on The Glasspack's track "Peepshow". The album was released on Small Stone Records in May 2004.

In 2010, Ed Mundell left Monster Magnet to collaborate with new musicians and producers. In 2011 he formed The Ultra Electric Mega Galactic, and has contributed to albums for Sasquatch, Abrahma, 9 Chambers. His solo album "Space Time Employment Agency" is slated for 2013.

In 2007 Pantella joined The Atomic Bitchwax. Also in 2007, Pantella and Baglino formed RIOTGOD, along with Garrett Sweeny (of Psycho Daisy), and Mark Sunshine.

In 2010, Pantella appeared on LadyKiller's debut self-titled release. He is credited as having played drums on 13 of the 16 songs, in addition to having tracked more than half of the album at his recording studio in Sayerville, New Jersey.

In 2010, the first single "American Dream" was released on One Voice by Capricorn, a band formed by Phil Caivano, Todd Youth (of Murphy's Law, Danzig, Ace Frehley, Glen Campbell and The Chelsea Smiles) and Karl Rosqvist (of Danzig, The Chelsea Smiles and Michael Monroe).

Chris Kosnik has played in The Atomic Bitchwax since its formation in 1993.

Discography

Studio albums

Remix/redux albums

EPs

Compilation albums

Singles

References

External links

 
 

 
Musical groups established in 1989
American hard rock musical groups
American space rock musical groups
American stoner rock musical groups
Heavy metal musical groups from New Jersey
Musicians from New Jersey
Musical quintets
Napalm Records artists
Music of Red Bank, New Jersey
Glitterhouse Records artists
A&M Records artists